NEC Green Rockets Tokatsu (formerly NEC Green Rockets) is a Japanese rugby union team in the Japan Rugby League One. The team's captain is Ryota Asano. The previous captain was Takuro Miuchi, who was also the captain of the Japan national rugby union team. Before the semi-professional Top League was created, the team was just known as "NEC". The amateur club was founded in 1985 in the Kantō region.

NEC Green Rockets won the All-Japan Championship final for the second time on 27 February 2005, beating Toyota Verblitz 17-13. They drew 6-6 with Toshiba Brave Lupus in the 43rd Japan Championship final on 26 February 2006 after an effective defensive effort and the sin-binning of Glen Marsh in the last ten minutes of the game.

The team rebranded as Green Rockets Tokatsu ahead of the rebranding of the Top League to the Japan Rugby League One in 2022.

Honours
 All-Japan Championship
 Champions: 2005, 2006 (with Toshiba Brave Lupus)

Current squad

The Green Rockets Tokatsu for the 2023 season is:

Former players
John Kirwan - (before the Top League started), and later head coach of Japan national rugby union team
Kiyonori Okano
Takayuki Higo - coach
George Konia
Glen Marsh
Joe Stanley
Jeremy Stanley
Alex Goode
Takuro Miuchi
Yuta Inose (2004-18, 161 games) Prop, Japanese International (2008, 6 caps)
Nili Latu (2007-15, 110 games) Loose forward, Tongan International (2006-, 54 caps)

References

External links
NEC, Toshiba share title, Daily Yomiuri, February 27, 2006
NEC Green Rockets - official site
Rugby gods smile on Green Rockets, Japan Times February 28, 2005

Japan Rugby League One teams
Rugby in Kantō
Rugby clubs established in 1985
Tourist attractions in Chiba Prefecture
NEC Corporation
1985 establishments in Japan